MacGillivray's prion (Pachyptila macgillivrayi)  is a species of small petrels of the Southern Ocean. It is found on Roche Quille, off Saint Paul Island and on Gough Island in the Tristan da Cunha group, south-central Atlantic Ocean. It was formerly present on Amsterdam Island in the central South Indian Ocean.

MacGillivray's prion was formerly considered to be conspecific with Salvin's prion but is now considered to be a separate species based on a molecular phylogenetic analysis and a comparison of the bill morphologies that was published in 2022.

References 

MacGillivray's prion
Fauna of the Auckland Islands
MacGillivray's prion
MacGillivray's prion